Mikhail Ivanovich Belsky (Russian: Михаил Иванович Бельский; 1753, St. Petersburg - 29 May 1794, St. Petersburg) was a Russian Classical painter, commonly known for his portraits made during Catherine the Great's reign.

Biography 

His father, Ivan Ivanovich Belsky, was a history painter and Academician at the Imperial Academy of Arts. In 1770, the Academy awarded him a silver medal for his outstanding classwork. His primary instructors there were Anton Losenko and Dmitry Levitzky.

In 1773, together with the engraver, Gavriil Skorodumov, he was awarded a travel grant to study abroad, in London. They received 300 Rubles per year, and letters of recommendation. When they arrived, they were placed under the patronage of Count , the Russian Envoy. Classes at the Royal Academy of Arts were open to them, they were able to copy the Old Masters, attend lectures and travel throughout the provinces.

In 1776, they were scheduled to continue their travels, but Skorodumov chose to remain in London. Belsky went to Paris and became a student of Jean-Baptiste Greuze in 1780, at his father's expense.

Very little is known of his life beyond that point, except that he returned to Russia and worked as a portrait painter in St. Petersburg. Few of his paintings have been identified with any certainty and most are believed to be in the possession of their subject's families.

References

Further reading 
Primary sources
 
Scholarly notes
 
Reference books
 

1753 births
1794 deaths
Russian painters
Russian portrait painters
Imperial Academy of Arts alumni
Artists from Saint Petersburg